
Gmina Chmielnik is a rural gmina (administrative district) in Rzeszów County, Subcarpathian Voivodeship, in south-eastern Poland.

Villages
Gmina Chmielnik contains the villages and settlements of Błędowa Tyczyńska, Borówki, Chmielnik, Wola Rafałowska and Zabratówka.

Neighbouring gminas
Gmina Chmielnik is bordered by the gminas of Hyżne, Krasne, Łańcut, Markowa and Tyczyn.

References
Polish official population figures 2006

Chmielnik
Gmina Chmielnik